Entoloma mougeotii is a species of fungus belonging to the family Entolomataceae.

Synonym:
 Eccilia mougeotii Fr., 1873 (= basionym)

References

Entolomataceae